The fulvous-breasted flatbill (Rhynchocyclus fulvipectus) is a species of bird in the family Tyrannidae. It is found in Bolivia, Colombia, Ecuador, Peru, and Venezuela.  Its natural habitat is subtropical or tropical moist montane forests.

References

fulvous-breasted flatbill
Birds of the Northern Andes
fulvous-breasted flatbill
fulvous-breasted flatbill
Taxonomy articles created by Polbot